Major-General Thomas Harrison, baptised 16 July 1616, executed 13 October 1660, was a prominent member of the radical religious sect known as the Fifth Monarchists, and a soldier who fought for Parliament and the Commonwealth in the Wars of the Three Kingdoms. One of those who approved the Execution of Charles I in January 1649, he was a strong supporter of Oliver Cromwell before the two fell out when The Protectorate was established in 1653. Following the 1660 Stuart Restoration, he was arrested, found guilty of treason as a regicide, and sentenced to death. He was hanged, drawn and quartered on 13 October 1660, facing his execution with a courage noted by various observers, including the diarist Samuel Pepys.

Personal details
Thomas Harrison was baptised 16 July 1616, second of four children and only son of Richard Harrison, four times mayor of Newcastle-under-Lyme, and his wife Mary. In 1646, he married his cousin Catherine Harrison; they had three children, all of whom died as infants.

Career 
Harrison was probably educated at a local Grammar school before moving to London, where he became clerk to a lawyer based in Clifford's Inn. When the First English Civil War began in August 1642, the Earl of Essex was appointed commander of the Parliamentarian army, and Harrison enlisted in his personal troop of Lifeguards, which was recruited almost exclusively from the Inns of Court. Other members included Charles Fleetwood, Edmund Ludlow and Nathaniel Rich, all of whom played important roles in the political and religious conflicts that followed. This unit fought in two of the earliest battles of the war, Powick Bridge in September and Edgehill in October 1642. 

In summer 1643, he transferred to the army of the Eastern Association as captain of a cavalry troop in the Earl of Manchester's regiment. He had reached the rank of lieutenant-colonel by the time it took part in the decisive Battle of Marston Moor in July 1644.  

He fought in many of the major battles of the war and joined the New Model Army in 1645. By the end of the conflict he had risen to the rank of major-general and was a noted friend and supporter of Oliver Cromwell.

He was elected to the Long Parliament for Wendover in 1646. His regiment maintained strong Leveller sympathies, mutinying in 1647.

Second English Civil War
When conflict resumed he was wounded at Appleby in July 1648. He had to return to London but was well enough to command the escort that brought the King to London in January 1649. Harrison sat as a commissioner (judge) at the trial and was the seventeenth of fifty-nine commissioners to sign the death warrant of King Charles I.

In 1650, Harrison was appointed to a military command in Wales where he was apparently extremely severe. He was promoted to the rank of Major-General in 1651 and commanded the army in England during Cromwell's Scottish expedition. He fought at the battle of Knutsford in August and at Worcester in September 1651.

By the early 1650s Harrison was associated with the radical Fifth Monarchists and became one of their key speakers. He still supported Cromwell and aided in the dissolution of the Rump Parliament in April 1653. He opposed the parliament on the basis that it was blocking more stringent religious reforms – he wanted a more "godly" parliament. Harrison was a radical member of the Nominated Assembly (Barebones Parliament) that replaced Parliament. When the assembly was dissolved, Harrison and others refused to leave and had to be forced out by soldiers. Harrison was dismissed from the Army in December.

Like many, he was outraged by the formation of the Protectorate and the elevation of Cromwell to Lord Protector. Under the Protectorate (1653–60) Harrison was imprisoned four times.

Arrest and trial 

After Cromwell's death Harrison remained quietly in his home, supporting none of the contenders for power. Following the Stuart Restoration, Harrison declined to flee and was arrested in May 1660.

He was tried on 11 October 1660. Edmond Ludlow described the trial in his memoirs,  

Harrison's sentence was "That you be led to the place from whence you came, and from thence be drawn upon a hurdle to the place of execution, and then you shall be hanged by the neck and, being alive, shall be cut down, and your privy members to be cut off, and your entrails be taken out of your body and, you living, the same to be burnt before your eyes, and your head to be cut off, your body to be divided into four-quarters, and head and quarters to be disposed of at the pleasure of the King's majesty. And the Lord have mercy on your soul."

Execution
Major-General Harrison was the first of the Regicides to be executed by being hanged, drawn and quartered on 13 October 1660. Harrison, after being hanged for several minutes and then cut open, was reported to have leaned across and hit his executioner—resulting in the swift removal of his head.  His entrails were thrown onto a nearby fire. His head adorned the sledge that drew fellow regicide John Cook to his execution, before being displayed in Westminster Hall; his quarters were fastened to the city gates.

Samuel Pepys wrote an eyewitness account of the execution at Charing Cross, in which Major General Harrison was drily reported to be "looking as cheerful as any man could do in that condition". This account is also quoted on a plaque on the wall of the Hung, Drawn and Quartered public house near Pepys Street, where the diarist lived and worked in the Navy Office. In his final moments, as he was being led up the scaffold, the hangman asked for his forgiveness. Upon hearing his request Thomas Harrison replied, "I do forgive thee with all my heart... Alas poor man, thou doith it ignorantly, the Lord grant that this sin may be not laid to thy charge." Thomas Harrison then gave all of the money that remained in his pockets to his executioner and was thereafter executed.

Edmond Ludlow also provided an account of the execution at Charing Cross: 

In his book The Better Angels of Our Nature, Steven Pinker wrote about the execution:

References

Sources
 
 
 

1606 births
1660 deaths
New Model Army generals
English MPs 1640–1648
Parliamentarian military personnel of the English Civil War
Fifth Monarchists
People from Staffordshire
Executed regicides of Charles I
People executed by Stuart England by hanging, drawing and quartering
People from Newcastle-under-Lyme